Digital MockUp or DMU is a concept that allows the description of a product, usually in 3D, for its entire life cycle. Digital Mockup is enriched by all the activities that contribute to describing the product. The product design engineers, the manufacturing engineers, and the support engineers work together to create and manage the DMU. One of the objectives is to have an important knowledge of the future or the supported product to replace any physical prototypes with virtual ones, using 3D computer graphics techniques. As an extension it is also frequently referred to as Digital Prototyping or Virtual Prototyping. These two specific definitions refer to the production of a physical prototype, but they are part of the DMU concept. DMU allows engineers to design and configure complex products and validate their designs without ever needing to build a physical model.

Among the techniques and technologies which make this possible are: 
 the use of light-weight 3D models with multiple levels of detail using lightweight data structures such as JT XVL and PDF allow engineers to visualize, analyze, and interact with large amounts of product data in real-time on standard desktop computers.
 direct interface to between Digital Mockups and PDM systems.
 active digital mockup technology that unites the ability to visualize the assembly mockup with the ability to measure, analyze, simulate, design and redesign.

Methodology and process

Technologies
 Product Life Cycle Management
 Visualization
 Collaboration
 Large Model Rendering
 Interference Checking (aka Clearance Analysis or Clash Analysis)
 Measurement Tools
 Cross Sectioning
 Path Extraction & Swept Volume Analysis
 Constraint Management
 Product Structure Modeling
 Product Data Management (PDM)

Software
 NX from Siemens Digital Industries Software
 CATIA from Dassault Systèmes
 Orealia from Onesia for Interactive 3D Digital MockUp
 Showcase from Autodesk
 Creo from PTC
 Open Cascade Technology products from Open Cascade

See also
 CAD data exchange

Computer-aided design
Product lifecycle management